Prince Nayef bin Abdullah (14 November 1914 – 12 October 1983) was the younger son of King Abdullah I of Jordan, by his second wife, Suzdil Khanum.

Nayef attended Victoria College in Cairo. He underwent Military training in Turkey, being assigned as the honorary Aide-de-Camp of the Turkish President Ismet Inönü between April 1939 until shortly before the outbreak of World War II in September the same year. He became regent of Jordan on 20 July 1951, following the assassination of Abdullah, because his older half-brother King Talal was reportedly suffering from poor health. Nayef ruled in his brother's stead until 6 September 1951, when Talal was judged fit to assume his royal duties. Nayef died in Jordan on 12 October 1983.

Honours 
 Knight Grand Cordon (Special Class) of the Supreme Order of the Renaissance (Kingdom of Jordan).
 Knight Grand Cordon of the Order of Independence (Kingdom of Jordan).
 Knight Grand Cordon of the Order of the Star of Jordan (Kingdom of Jordan).
 Knight Grand Cross of the Order of Civil Merit (Spain, 5 September 1949).
 Knight Grand Cross of the Order of Military Merit (with white distinctive) (Spain, 6 September 1949).
 Knight Grand Cross (Special Class) of the Order of the Two Rivers (Kingdom of Iraq).

Ancestry

References 

Jordanian princes
1914 births
1983 deaths
House of Hashim
Grand Cross of the Order of Civil Merit
Grand Cordons of the Order of Independence (Jordan)
Sons of kings
20th-century Jordanian people